Simon Shissler was an American politician.

Early life
Shissler was born on April 16, 1856 in Paradise Township, Lancaster County, Pennsylvania. At the age of two, he moved to Lancaster, Pennsylvania where he began attending public schools. His father died when Shissler was 13-years-old.

Career
Following his father's death, young Shissler became John Hull's apprentice in a cigar making business. Three years later, he worked for Albright & Bros and Metzger & Wiley, before excepting a position as a mailman where he served four years. In June 1889, Shissler formed his own business on 52nd North Queen Street, a tobacco firm called Simon Shissler and Son.

In 1890 Shissler was elected as a city council representative from the Democratic Party in a majorly Republican state. After the 1892 election, he served on the Special Water Committee and next year represented the Fifth ward of the state of Pennsylvania.

In 1898, the people of Lancaster, Pennsylvania voted him in as the twentieth mayor of the city for a two-year term. Simon Shissler decided not to pursue re-election, and in spring 1900 joined the school board of the ward following by a service to the City Democratic Committee.

Personal life
In 1879, Shissler married Alice Anderson. Together they had three children: Henry, Walter and Clyde, with the latter of which he owned a retail elgar and tobacco firm for 30 years.  Shissler’s great grandson, Andrew Shissler of Bethel Park, PA, was famous for playing lead bass in Morningside, later named Three Seventy Six after the departure of vocalist and co-founding member, Bryan Brunsel.

References

1856 births
Mayors of Lancaster, Pennsylvania
Pennsylvania Democrats
Year of death missing